Acrocercops praeclusa is a moth of the family Gracillariidae, known from Karnataka and Bihar, India, as well as Sri Lanka. It was described by Edward Meyrick in 1914. The hostplants for the species include Lannea coromandelica and Odina wodier.

References

praeclusa
Moths of Asia
Moths described in 1914